The Pear Bowl was a post-season college football bowl game held on Thanksgiving weekend in Oregon. The game was held six times, following the 1946 through 1951 seasons. The first two games were held in Ashland, Oregon and the last four were held in Medford, Oregon. Following the 1949 game, the Northwest Conference and Far West Conference signed an agreement to have their champions meet in the game. 

The games in Ashland were designed to raise funds for a new stadium on the Southern Oregon campus, while the Medford games were sponsored by Shriners International. The last three were sponsored by the Hillah Temple of the Shrine as a benefit for crippled children in Portland. In September 1952, the sponsoring organization voted to cancel the game due to economic and other considerations.

Game results

See also
 List of college bowl games

Notes

References

Defunct college football bowls
American football in Oregon
Sports in Ashland, Oregon
Sports in Medford, Oregon
1946 establishments in Oregon
1952 disestablishments in Oregon
Recurring sporting events established in 1946
Recurring sporting events disestablished in 1952